"The Boy Who Knew Too Much" is the twentieth episode of the fifth season of the American animated television series The Simpsons. It originally aired on the Fox network in the United States on May 5, 1994. In the episode, Mayor Quimby's nephew Freddy is wrongly accused of assaulting a waiter, with Bart (who is playing truant from school) being the sole witness to the true course of events. Since Bart cannot reveal what he knows without admitting that he skipped school, he faces the dilemma of either testifying on Freddy's behalf and facing punishment himself, or staying silent and allowing a miscarriage of justice.

The episode was written by John Swartzwelder and directed by Jeffrey Lynch. The new character Freddy, voiced by Dan Castellaneta, was given the same type of cheekbones and nose as Quimby to make them resemble each other. The episode features cultural references to films such as Westworld, Last Action Hero, and Free Willy, and the fictional characters Huckleberry Finn, Eddie, and Darwin. Actor Arnold Schwarzenegger and his wife Maria Shriver are also referenced in the episode.

Since airing, the episode has received mostly positive reviews from television critics. It acquired a Nielsen rating of 10.1, and was the fifth-highest rated show on the Fox network the week it aired.

Plot
Bart is unhappy about going to school on a sunny day, claiming that they are being treated like prisoners. His point is proven when a stressed-out Otto turns up driving a prison bus as the regular school bus had broken down. To make matters worse, the new classroom chairs are painfully uncomfortable and Edna Krabappel announces class will end two hours later than normal because someone has tampered with the school's clocks. Upset at being in class longer, Bart forges a dental appointment note so he can skip school. Convinced the note is forged, Principal Skinner chases Bart through Springfield. As Skinner is about to corner him, Bart jumps into a passing convertible car driven by Freddy Quimby, Mayor Quimby's nephew, as he is driving to the Quimby Compound.

At lunch, Freddy is served chowder, but he ridicules the waiter for pronouncing "chowder" with a French accent and demands he say it with a Boston accent. Freddy follows the waiter into the kitchen and appears to beat him up. Bart, hiding under a kitchen table, secretly witnesses the true turn of events. 

Freddy is charged with assault and battery and put on trial. The whole town seems to believe Freddy is guilty, especially after Freddy loses his temper with his own attorney and the jury after he does not pronounce the word "chowder" in a Boston accent. Bart knows otherwise and confesses to Lisa that he is the only witness who can prove Freddy's innocence, but is reluctant to testify because it would mean admitting that he skipped school and being punished by Skinner for it.

At the trial, the jury consists of Homer, Skinner, Moleman, Ned, Helen, Jasper, Patty, Apu, and Akira. Homer disrupts proceedings by sleeping through the trial. The rest of the jury intends to convict Freddy, but Homer casts the lone dissenting vote, in order to cause a deadlock, just so he can enjoy the deluxe accommodations offered to the sequestered jury at a hotel with free room service and cable television.

In court, Lisa convinces Bart to testify. Bart tells the court that Freddy did not assault the waiter; instead, Freddy left with a bottle of champagne, and the waiter injured himself in a series of clumsy actions after slipping on a half-eaten mouthful that Bart had taken out of a giant Rice Krispies square. The waiter indignantly denies he is clumsy. Rising to protest, he trips over a chair and falls out the window into an open-roof truck filled with rat traps. When asked how he witnessed the incident when he was supposed to be in class, Bart reluctantly admits that he skipped school. Freddy is cleared of all charges. Skinner gives Bart four months' detention for skipping school, but still praises him for his honesty.

Production
"The Boy Who Knew Too Much" was written by John Swartzwelder and directed by Jeffrey Lynch. Executive producer David Mirkin "loved" that the whole situation of Bart seeing the waiter injure himself and not telling the truth ties together with the Homer plot in that it causes Homer to get jury duty and then only caring about going to the hotel. Mirkin thought it "worked really well". The new character Freddy was voiced by The Simpsons cast member Dan Castellaneta, who also provides the voice of Mayor Quimby. Freddy was given the same type of cheekbones and nose as Quimby to make them resemble each other. When Bart is fleeing from Skinner, a shot of Bart running down a hill from the season four episode "Kamp Krusty" was re-used along with a shot of Bart running away from the season three episode "Dog of Death".

Cultural references

While riding on the prison bus, Bart looks out the window and has a dream that features him, Huckleberry Finn and Abraham Lincoln on a raft going down a river in Springfield. Mirkin said Swartzwelder had always enjoyed putting presidents into his jokes, and this was only one of his many references to Lincoln. Bart's claim to film star and recurring character Rainier Wolfcastle (a parody of Arnold Schwarzenegger) that his "last movie really sucked" and Chief Wiggum's subsequent claim of "magic ticket, my ass" are in reference to Last Action Hero, a Schwarzenegger film featuring magic tickets that was panned by critics. Additionally, Wolfcastle's wife is named Maria; Schwarzenegger's wife at the time was Maria Shriver.

Series creator Matt Groening has a cameo appearance as the court illustrator in the Quimby trial. He can be seen signing his name on his sketch. During the trial, Bart quips "the system works. Just ask Claus von Bülow". This is a reference to the British socialite who was accused of attempted murder, but was acquitted after two trials. Of the twelve jurors, Homer is the only one to vote "not guilty", angering the other eleven; the trial ends with Freddy being found not guilty. This is a reference to the film 12 Angry Men. During the trial, Homer sings the jingle of the cat food company Meow Mix in his head. Jasper, one of the jurors, wants the trial to be over so that he can go home and watch television. He says that tonight "the dog from Frasier will ride the dolphin from seaQuest". Both Frasier and seaQuest DSV were very popular on NBC, the highest-rated network in the United States for most of the 1990s.

At the hotel, Homer watches a new "director's cut" of the 1993 family film Free Willy that features Jesse being crushed by the titular whale. Homer is saddened by this, and says, "Oh, I don't like this new director's cut!" Homer rooms with Skinner at the hotel, and in a reference to the television series The Odd Couple, Skinner picks up a cigar butt from the floor with his umbrella while cleaning the room, just as Tony Randall does in the opening credits of that series.

Reception

Critical reception
Since airing, the episode has received mostly positive reviews from television critics.

The authors of the book I Can't Believe It's a Bigger and Better Updated Unofficial Simpsons Guide, Warren Martyn and Adrian Wood, praised the episode for containing "a memorable guest character in the French waiter Monsieur Lacosse, two great slapstick sequences involving the same, and displays Principal Skinner — pursuing Bart across the mountains like 'a non-giving-up school guy', and confessing that in some ways he's "a small man; a petty, small man" — in particularly fine form."

DVD Movie Guide's Colin Jacobson thought Freddy Quimby "may well be the most unpleasant character to grace the series — in an amusing way, though Freddy’s edginess makes him less amusing than his uncle. It’s rather startling to see Skinner so rapidly resume his dislike of Bart after the last episode, though. It’s fun to see his superhuman powers in the pursuit of Bart, and the mystery aspects of the show help make it a very good one. Add to that Homer on jury duty for even more entertainment."

Patrick Bromley of DVD Verdict gave the episode a grade of A for its "excellent bits thrown together to make this one, joke for joke, one of the season's funniest".

In 2007, Patrick Enright of Today.com called it his tenth favorite episode of the show. He said it was a perfect example of the show's "hilarious randomness" because of jokes such as Homer singing the Meow Mix cat food jingle, and the scene in which Homer discovers that if the jury’s deadlocked, they will be sequestered in a luxury hotel. Homer justifies his decision to be the lone dissenting voice by saying, "I’m only doing what I think is right. I believe Freddy Quimby should walk out of here a free hotel (when he should have said a 'free man')."

Entertainment.ie named it among the 10 greatest Simpsons episodes of all time.

Ratings
In its original broadcast, "The Boy Who Knew Too Much" finished fiftieth in the ratings for the week of May 2–8, 1994, with a Nielsen rating of 10.1, equivalent to approximately 9.5 million viewing households. It was the fifth highest-rated show on the Fox network that week, following Married... with Children, Living Single, Melrose Place and Beverly Hills, 90210.

References

External links

The Simpsons (season 5) episodes
1994 American television episodes
Juries in fiction
Television shows written by John Swartzwelder